Léonor Serraille (born 1986) is a French screenwriter and director.

Biography
Serraille was born in Lyon and was a student at La Fémis. In 2013 Serraille completed her master's degree in general and comparative literature at the Sorbonne-Nouvelle University. Her first feature film Montparnasse Bienvenue was a critical success at the Cannes Film Festival in 2017 and Serraille won the Caméra d'Or for the best debut film. The film also won the prize for best French feature film at the 6th Champs-Élysées Film Festival in Paris.

Sources

1986 births
Living people
Mass media people from Lyon
French screenwriters
Sorbonne Nouvelle University Paris 3 alumni
Directors of Caméra d'Or winners